This page shows the results of the Men's Wrestling Competition at the 1971 Pan American Games, held from July 30 to August 13, 1971, in Cali, Colombia. Freestyle wrestling was the only discipline at these Pan Am Games.

Men's competition

Freestyle (– 48 kg)

Freestyle (– 52 kg)

Freestyle (– 57 kg)

Freestyle (– 62 kg)

Freestyle (– 68 kg)

Freestyle (– 74 kg)

Freestyle (– 82 kg)

Freestyle (– 90 kg)

Freestyle (– 100 kg)

Freestyle (+ 100 kg)

Medal table

See also
 Wrestling at the 1972 Summer Olympics

References
 Sports 123

1971
1971 Pan American Games
P
Wrestling in Colombia